Kardzar (also Romanized as Kardzār and Kord Zār) is a village in Ferdows Rural District, in the Central District of Shahriar County, Tehran Province, Iran. At the 2006 census, its population was 3,110, in 815 families.

References 

Populated places in Shahriar County